Russian Holiday is a 1992 film directed by Greydon Clark and starring Susan Blakely and Barry Bostwick.

Cast
Jeff Altman as Milt Holly
Victoria Barrett as Viktoria
Susan Blakely as Susan Dennison
Barry Bostwick as Grant Ames
E.G. Marshall as Joe Meadows

References

External links

1992 films
American thriller drama films
Films about vacationing
Films directed by Greydon Clark
1990s English-language films